Cranbrook was the name of a provincial electoral district in the Canadian province of British Columbia centred on the town of Cranbrook in the southern Rockies and including nearby Kimberley and other towns in the southern end of the Rocky Mountain Trench.

Cranbrook riding made its first appearance on the hustings in the election of 1903.  In a redistribution after the 1963 election the area covered by this riding was incorporated into the new Kootenay riding (same name but smaller than the original 1871-vintage Kootenay riding).

For other current and historical electoral districts in the Kootenay region, please see Kootenay (electoral districts).

Electoral history 
Note:  Winners of each election are in bold.

|Liberal
|James Horace King
|align="right"|500 	 	
|align="right"|53.48%
|align="right"|
|align="right"|unknown
|- bgcolor="white"
!align="right" colspan=3|Total valid votes
!align="right"|935 	
!align="right"|100.00%
!align="right"|
|- bgcolor="white"
!align="right" colspan=3|Total rejected ballots
!align="right"|
!align="right"|
!align="right"|
|- bgcolor="white"
!align="right" colspan=3|Turnout
!align="right"|%
!align="right"|
!align="right"|
|}

|Liberal
|James Horace King
|align="right"|473
|align="right"|44.54%
|align="right"|
|align="right"|unknown
|- bgcolor="white"
!align="right" colspan=3|Total valid votes
!align="right"|1,062 
!align="right"|100.00%
!align="right"|
|- bgcolor="white"
!align="right" colspan=3|Total rejected ballots
!align="right"|
!align="right"|
!align="right"|
|- bgcolor="white"
!align="right" colspan=3|Turnout
!align="right"|%
!align="right"|
!align="right"|
|}

 
|Liberal
|Malcolm Archibald MacDonald
|align="right"|501 	  	 	
|align="right"|35.66%
|align="right"|
|align="right"|unknown
|- bgcolor="white"
!align="right" colspan=3|Total valid votes
!align="right"|1,405 
!align="right"|100.00%
!align="right"|
|- bgcolor="white"
!align="right" colspan=3|Total rejected ballots
!align="right"|
!align="right"|
!align="right"|
|- bgcolor="white"
!align="right" colspan=3|Turnout
!align="right"|%
!align="right"|
!align="right"|
|}

|- bgcolor="white"
!align="right" colspan=3|Total valid votes
!align="right"|n/a
!align="right"| -.-%
!align="right"|
|- bgcolor="white"
!align="right" colspan=3|Total rejected ballots
!align="right"|
!align="right"|
!align="right"|
|- bgcolor="white"
!align="right" colspan=3|Turnout
!align="right"|%
!align="right"|
!align="right"|
|}	

|Liberal
|James Horace King
|align="right"|727 	 	 	
|align="right"|59.06%
|align="right"|
|align="right"|unknown
|- bgcolor="white"
!align="right" colspan=3|Total valid votes
!align="right"|1,231 	 	
!align="right"|100.00%
!align="right"|
|- bgcolor="white"
!align="right" colspan=3|Total rejected ballots
!align="right"|
!align="right"|
!align="right"|
|- bgcolor="white"
!align="right" colspan=3|Turnout
!align="right"|%
!align="right"|
!align="right"|
|}

|Liberal
|James Horace King
|align="right"|941 		 	 	
|align="right"|50.98%
|- bgcolor="white"
!align="right" colspan=3|Total valid votes
!align="right"|1,846	
!align="right"|100.00%

 
|Liberal
|John Taylor 
|align="right"|1,062 			 	 		
|align="right"|44.47%
|align="right"|
|align="right"|unknown

|- bgcolor="white"
!align="right" colspan=3|Total valid votes
!align="right"|2,388 	
!align="right"|100.00%
!align="right"|
|- bgcolor="white"
!align="right" colspan=3|Total rejected ballots
!align="right"|
!align="right"|
!align="right"|
|- bgcolor="white"
!align="right" colspan=3|Turnout
!align="right"|%
!align="right"|
!align="right"|
|}  	   	 

 
|Liberal
|Frank Mitchell MacPherson
|align="right"|1,833 	
|align="right"|52.46%
|align="right"|
|align="right"|unknown

|- bgcolor="white"
!align="right" colspan=3|Total valid votes
!align="right"|3,494
!align="right"|100.00%
!align="right"|
|- bgcolor="white"
!align="right" colspan=3|Total rejected ballots
!align="right"|55
!align="right"|
!align="right"|
|- bgcolor="white"
!align="right" colspan=3|Turnout
!align="right"|%
!align="right"|
!align="right"|
|}  	  	  	  	

 
|Co-operative Commonwealth Fed.
|Charles Bennett
|align="right"|1,231 	 		 	
|align="right"|29.01%
|align="right"|
|align="right"|unknown
 
|Liberal
|Frank Mitchell MacPherson
|align="right"|2,951
|align="right"|69.53%
|align="right"|
|align="right"|unknown
|- bgcolor="white"
!align="right" colspan=3|Total valid votes
!align="right"|4,244  
!align="right"|100.00%
!align="right"|
|- bgcolor="white"
!align="right" colspan=3|Total rejected ballots
!align="right"|33
!align="right"|
!align="right"|
|- bgcolor="white"
!align="right" colspan=3|Turnout
!align="right"|%
!align="right"|
!align="right"|
|}

 
|Liberal
|Frank Mitchell MacPherson
|align="right"|3,110 
|align="right"|76.73%
|align="right"|
|align="right"|unknown
 
|Co-operative Commonwealth Fed.
|Samuel Smith Shearer
|align="right"|943 		 		 	
|align="right"|23.27%
|align="right"|
|align="right"|unknown
|- bgcolor="white"
!align="right" colspan=3|Total valid votes
!align="right"|4,053  
!align="right"|100.00%
!align="right"|
|- bgcolor="white"
!align="right" colspan=3|Total rejected ballots
!align="right"|79
!align="right"|
!align="right"|
|- bgcolor="white"
!align="right" colspan=3|Turnout
!align="right"|%
!align="right"|
!align="right"|
|}

 
|Co-operative Commonwealth Fed.
|Oscar Albin Eliasin
|align="right"|1,548 		 	 		 	 		
|align="right"|33.89%
|align="right"|
|align="right"|unknown

 
|Liberal
|Arnold Joseph McGrath
|align="right"|1,405 		
|align="right"|30.76%
|align="right"|
|align="right"|unknown
|- bgcolor="white"
!align="right" colspan=3|Total valid votes
!align="right"|4,568 	  
!align="right"|100.00%
!align="right"|
|- bgcolor="white"
!align="right" colspan=3|Total rejected ballots
!align="right"|52
!align="right"|
!align="right"|
|- bgcolor="white"
!align="right" colspan=3|Turnout
!align="right"|%
!align="right"|
!align="right"|
|}

 
|Co-operative Commonwealth Fed.
|Henry Gammon
|align="right"|1,965 	
|align="right"|46.40%
|align="right"|
|align="right"|unknown

|- bgcolor="white"
!align="right" colspan=3|Total valid votes
!align="right"|4,235
!align="right"|100.00%
!align="right"|
|- bgcolor="white"
!align="right" colspan=3|Total rejected ballots
!align="right"|40
!align="right"|
!align="right"|
|- bgcolor="white"
!align="right" colspan=3|Turnout
!align="right"|%
!align="right"|
!align="right"|
|}

 
|Co-operative Commonwealth Fed.
|Leo Thomas Nimsick
|align="right"|3,026
|align="right"|50.53%
|align="right"|
|align="right"|unknown

|- bgcolor="white"
!align="right" colspan=3|Total valid votes
!align="right"|5,989
!align="right"|100.00%
!align="right"|
|- bgcolor="white"
!align="right" colspan=3|Total rejected ballots
!align="right"|87
!align="right"|
!align="right"|
|- bgcolor="white"
!align="right" colspan=3|Turnout
!align="right"|%
!align="right"|
!align="right"|
|}

 
|B.C. Social Credit League
|Howard Cressman King
|align="right"|2,328          	 		 	 		
|align="right"|34.23%
|align="right"|3,044
|align="right"|48.67%
|align="right"|
|align="right"|unknown
 
|Liberal
|Maurice Gregory Klinkhammer
|align="right"|1,111     		 	 		 	 		
|align="right"|16.33%
|align="right"| -
|align="right"| -.- %
|align="right"|
|align="right"|unknown
 
|Conservative
|George England Kerr MacDonald
|align="right"|675        		 	 		 	 		
|align="right"|9.92%
|align="right"| -
|align="right"| -.- %
|align="right"|
|align="right"|unknown
 
|Co-operative Commonwealth Fed.
|Leo Thomas Nimsick
|align="right"|2,688 	 		
|align="right"|39.52%
|align="right"|3,210
|align="right"|51.33%
|align="right"|
|align="right"|unknown
|- bgcolor="white"
!align="right" colspan=3|Total valid votes
!align="right"|6,802      
!align="right"|100.00%
!align="right"|6,254  
|align="right"|
|align="right"|
|- bgcolor="white"
!align="right" colspan=3|Total rejected ballots
!align="right"|168
!align="right"|
!align="right"|
!align="right"|
!align="right"|
|- bgcolor="white"
!align="right" colspan=3|Turnout
!align="right"|%
!align="right"|
!align="right"|
!align="right"|
!align="right"|
|- bgcolor="white"
!align="right" colspan=7|3  Preferential ballot.  First and final of three counts only shown.
|}

 
|Liberal
|George Wayne Haddad
|align="right"|1,615 	  	
|align="right"|23.79%
|align="right"| - 
|align="right"| -.- %
|align="right"|
|align="right"|unknown

 
|Co-operative Commonwealth Fed.
|Leo Thomas Nimsick
|align="right"|2,955
|align="right"|43.52%
|align="right"|3,460
|align="right"|555.66%
|align="right"|
|align="right"|unknown
|- bgcolor="white"
!align="right" colspan=3|Total valid votes
!align="right"|6,789 	  	 	  	 	   
!align="right"|100.00%
!align="right"|6,216
|align="right"|
|align="right"|
|- bgcolor="white"
!align="right" colspan=3|Total rejected ballots
!align="right"|238
!align="right"|
!align="right"|
!align="right"|
!align="right"|
|- bgcolor="white"
!align="right" colspan=3|Turnout
!align="right"|%
!align="right"|
!align="right"|
!align="right"|
!align="right"|
|- bgcolor="white"
!align="right" colspan=7|4  Preferential ballot.  First and second of two counts only shown.
|}  	  	  	  	 

 
|Liberal
|Francis Vincent Downey
|align="right"|902  			 	 		 	 		
|align="right"|14.47%
|align="right"|
|align="right"|unknown
 
|Co-operative Commonwealth Fed.
|Leo Thomas Nimsick
|align="right"|3,321
|align="right"|53.26%
|align="right"|

|- bgcolor="white"
!align="right" colspan=3|Total valid votes
!align="right"|6,235  
!align="right"|100.00%
!align="right"|
|- bgcolor="white"
!align="right" colspan=3|Total rejected ballots
!align="right"|54
!align="right"|
!align="right"|
|- bgcolor="white"
!align="right" colspan=3|Turnout
!align="right"|%
!align="right"|
!align="right"|
|}

 
|Liberal
|Jack Glennie
|align="right"|1,475 		
|align="right"|23.39 %
|align="right"|
|align="right"|unknown
 
|Co-operative Commonwealth Fed.
|Leo Thomas Nimsick
|align="right"|2,786		
|align="right"|44.18%
|align="right"|
|align="right"|unknown

 
|Progressive Conservative
|Willie Harvey Webber
|align="right"|345 				 	 		 	 		
|align="right"|5.47%
|align="right"|
|align="right"|unknown
|- bgcolor="white"
!align="right" colspan=3|Total valid votes
!align="right"|6,306 
!align="right"|100.00%
!align="right"|
|- bgcolor="white"
!align="right" colspan=3|Total rejected ballots
!align="right"|67
!align="right"|
!align="right"|
|- bgcolor="white"
!align="right" colspan=3|Turnout
!align="right"|%
!align="right"|
!align="right"|
|}

 
|Conservative
|William Otis Green
|align="right"|1,526 				
|align="right"|23.27%
|align="right"|
|align="right"|unknown
 
|Liberal
|Lloyd James Hoole
|align="right"|835 	
|align="right"|12.73%
|align="right"|
|align="right"|unknown

|- bgcolor="white"
!align="right" colspan=3|Total valid votes
!align="right"|6,557  
!align="right"|100.00%
!align="right"|
|- bgcolor="white"
!align="right" colspan=3|Total rejected ballots
!align="right"|35
!align="right"|
!align="right"|
|- bgcolor="white"
!align="right" colspan=3|Turnout
!align="right"|%
!align="right"|
!align="right"|
|}

Following the 1963 election the Cranbrook riding was redistributed and a new riding, Kootenay was formed (same name as the original 1871 Kootenay riding, but much smaller in scope).  The Kootenay riding combined Cranbrook with the riding of Fernie and parts of the Columbia ridings.

Former provincial electoral districts of British Columbia